Zahida Zaidi (4 January 1930 – 11 January 2011) was an Indian scholar, professor of English literature, poet, dramatist, playwright, and literary critic. Her literary contributions include more than 30 books in Urdu and English related to social, psychological, and philosophical aspects, and the translation of the literary works of Chekhov, Pirandello, Beckett, Sartre, and Ionesco. She produced and directed several plays of Indian and Western authors in Urdu and English. She received the Hum Sab Ghalib Award for Urdu drama awarded  by the Ghalib Institute, Delhi, and the Kul Hind Bahadur Shah Zafar Award.

Early life and education
Zahida Zaidi was born on 4 January 1930 in Meerut, India. She was the youngest of five daughters. Her father, S.M. Mustehsin Zaidi, taught mathematics at the University of Cambridge and was a well-known advocate in Meerut. He died when Zaidi was very young. Her paternal grandfather, K. G. Saqulain, was a noted social reformer, while her maternal grandfather, Maulana Khwaja Altaf Hussain Hali, was an Urdu poet. An older sister, Sajida Zaidi, who died two months after her, was also a well-known poet and a professor of education at the Aligarh Muslim University (AMU); the two were famously known as the "Zaidi Sisters" in the literary community. Though from a conservative Muslim society, she and Sajida stopped wearing the burqa as students at the AMU and rode their bicycles to class.

Her widowed mother moved the family from Meerut to Panipat and sent her girls to study at the AMU, as it was a premier educational institution. At AMU, Zaidi obtained the degrees of Bachelor of Arts (BA) and Master of Arts (MA) in English language. She continued her academic career in England, studying with a Modified Overseas Merit Scholarship at the University of Cambridge, where she obtained BA Honours and MA degrees in English. On her return to India, she taught English at the Lady Irwin College and Miranda House, University of Delhi, and also at Women's College, AMU, from 1952 to 1964. She was appointed Reader in the AMU Department of English in 1964. In 1983 she became a Professor of English, and retired in 1988. Earlier, during 1971–72, she worked as a fellow at the Indian Institute of Advanced Study in Shimla.

Literary career
Zaidi was a poet and dramatist of distinction in English and Urdu. Her translations into Urdu include the plays of Anton Chekhov, Luigi Pirandello, Jean-Paul Sartre, and Samuel Beckett, as well as Pablo Neruda's poetry; these works were translated from the original versions in French, Italian, and English. She proficiently staged many of these plays. Besides drama, her interests included philosophy and religion, and Western, Indian, and Persian literature. Through her writings, she was fond of expressing an "existential and mystical strain" and had a knack for word-play. Her debut collection of poetry,  Zahr-e-Hyat (Life's Poison) (1970), earned her the Urdu Academy Award in 1971. Her second poetry collection was titled Dharti ka Lams (Touch of Earth) (1975). Her poems titled Beyond Words and Broken Pieces were published in 1979. Her last book was Glimpses of Urdu Literature, which included a section on Nature in Iqbal's poetry.

Zaidi died in Aligarh on 11 January 2011.

References

1930 births
2011 deaths
20th-century Indian women writers
20th-century Indian dramatists and playwrights
Indian women poets
People from Meerut
Poets from Uttar Pradesh
Urdu-language women writers
20th-century Indian translators
Indian Muslims
Indian women educational theorists
20th-century Indian educational theorists
Women writers from Uttar Pradesh
Women scientists from Uttar Pradesh
Indian women translators
20th-century Indian poets
Dramatists and playwrights from Uttar Pradesh
Women educators from Uttar Pradesh
Educators from Uttar Pradesh
Recipients of Ghalib Award
20th-century women educators
Academic staff of Aligarh Muslim University
Twelvers
Indian Shia Muslims